Raphitoma alternans is a species of sea snail, a marine gastropod mollusc in the family Raphitomidae.

Description
The length of the shell reaches a length of 10 mm. It has a paucispiral protoconch.

Distribution
This marine species occurs in the Central and Eastern Mediterranean Sea.

References
Footnotes

Bibliography
 Oliverio, M. (2018). Catalogue of the primary types of marine molluscan taxa described by Tommaso Allery Di Maria, Marquis of Monterosato, deposited in the Museo Civico di Zoologia, Roma. Zootaxa, 4477 (1), 1-138. 
 Gofas, S.; Le Renard, J.; Bouchet, P. (2001). Mollusca. in: Costello, M.J. et al. (eds), European Register of Marine Species: a check-list of the marine species in Europe and a bibliography of guides to their identification. Patrimoines Naturels. 50: 180-213.

External links
 Monterosato T. A. (di) (1884). Nomenclatura generica e specifica di alcune conchiglie mediterranee. Palermo, Virzi, 152 pp
 Gastropods.com: Raphitoma alternans
 
 ÖZTÜRK, BİLAL, et al. "Marine molluscs of the Turkish coasts: an updated checklist." Turkish Journal of Zoology 38.6 (2014): 832-879

alternans
Gastropods described in 1884